Simon Lundmark (born 8 October 2000) is a Swedish professional ice hockey defenceman currently playing for the Manitoba Moose of the American Hockey League (AHL) as a prospect to the Winnipeg Jets of the National Hockey League (NHL).

Playing career
Lundmark was selected 51st overall by the Winnipeg Jets in the 2019 NHL Entry Draft. He was signed by the Jets to a three-year, entry-level contract on 9 April 2021.

Career statistics

Regular season and playoffs

International

References

External links
 

2000 births
Living people
Linköping HC players
Manitoba Moose players
Ice hockey people from Stockholm
Swedish ice hockey defencemen
Winnipeg Jets draft picks